Sadri is a municipality in the Pali district of Rajasthan, India. It is considered the gateway to Marwar from Mewar. Sadri is one of the main places of worship for the Jain community. Ranakpur Temple and Shri Parshuram Mahadev Mandir are located in Sadri, which became a municipality (Nagar Palika) in 1961. Bhadras is located 3 km from Sadri along the Suhai river.

Sadri was previously populated by Nandwana brahman community. The Jagir used to belong to Sindhal Rathore Community.

Geography
It has an average elevation of 502 meters.

Demographics
According to the 2011 Census of India, Sadri had a population of 27,393. Males account for 50.2% (13,762) of the population and females 49.8% (13,631). Sadri has an average literacy rate of 65.54%, which is lower than the national average of 74.04%. The male literacy rate is 83.76%, while the female literacy rate is 46.55%. 14% of the population is under 6 years of age.

Transport
The nearest railway station on the Indian Railways network is Falna which is 25 km from Rani, Rajasthan. The nearest airport is Udaipur, around 100 km from the town. Sadri is on the Jodhpur - Udaipur road and State Highway No. 16. The national highway serving Sadri is 35 km from Sanderao. Sadri is also well connected with Pali, Nathdwara, Kumbhalgarh, Mt. Abu, and other cities.

Education and health
Sadri has several schools and institutions. Some of the notable ones are: 
 Vinayak Public Sec. School Sadri
 Desuri Tehshil's First English Medium School
 Saraswati, Vidya Mandir Sec. School Sadri
 M.D.S. Sec. School Sadri
 Adarsh Sr. Sec. The school (Organized by Shree Khetlaji Mandal)
 Delhi Convent Sec. School
 DMB Sr. Sec. School
 Govt. Girls Sr. Sec. School
 Roop Chand, Tara Chand, Deep Chand, Sajjmal Community Health Centre, a 75-bed Hospital
 Shree Vijay Vallabh Hospital

References

 Cities and towns in Pali district